Former Muslims or ex-Muslims are people who were Muslims, but subsequently left Islam. Although their numbers have increased, ex-Muslims still face ostracism or retaliation from their families and communities due to beliefs about apostasy in Islam.

Converted to an Abrahamic religion

Converted to Judaism

  – Jordanian Muslim of Circassian origin, converted to Judaism upon marrying an Israeli Jewish pilot in secret in Vienna. She later became a spy for Mossad. An Arabic TV series called An Eastern Girl (فتاة من الشرق) (Fatah min Asharq) was made about her starring Suzan Najm Aldeen as Amina. The book (مذكرات أخطر جاسوسة عربية للموساد .. أمينة المفتي) was written about her.

 Avraham Sinai – Lebanese former Shi'ite who converted to Judaism. He served as an informant for the Israelis while serving in Hezbollah, until his actions were uncovered. He fled to Israel and subsequently converted.
 Dario Hunter – American politician. Became the first Muslim born individual to be ordained a rabbi.
 Reza Jabari – Israeli of Iranian birth who hijacked a flight between Tehran and the Iranian resort island of Kish in September, 1995 while working as a flight attendant for Iranian carrier Kish Air flight 707.

Converted to Christianity

 Abdul Rahman – Afghan convert to Christianity who escaped the death penalty because of foreign pressure.
 Aben Humeya – (born Fernando de Valor) Morisco Chief who was crowned the Emir of Andalusia by his followers and led the Morisco Revolt against Philip II of Spain.
 Abo of Tiflis – Christian activist and the Patron Saint of the city of Tbilisi, Georgia.
 Abraham of Bulgaria – martyr and saint of the Russian Orthodox Church.
 St. Adolphus – Christian martyr who was put to death along with his brother, John, by Abd ar-Rahman II, Emir of Córdoba for apostasy.
 Akbar Gbaja-Biamila – American football player.
 Al-Mu'eiyyad – Abbasid prince and third son of Abbasid caliph, Al-Mutawakkil. He was converted to Christianity along with his three confidants by St. Theodore of Edessa, accepting the name "John" upon baptism. During Anarchy at Samarra period saw the rise of a legend that an Abbasid prince had converted to Christianity under the influence of Theodore of Edessa, taken the name "John" and been killed for his apostasy; Alexander Vasiliev speculates that Muayyad, who was killed in 866 by his brother Mu`tazz, may have been the convert. However, there is no Christian or Muslim record remotely associating Muayyad with Christianity or even, indeed, religious speculation. The motives for his murder seem to have been purely political; had he indeed converted, it would have given Mutazz an excuse to murder him for apostasy and been recorded.

 Albertus Soegijapranata – born in Surakarta, to a Muslim courtier and his wife who later converted to Roman Catholicism; the first native Indonesian bishop; a National Hero of Indonesia; known for his pro-nationalistic stance, often expressed as "100% Catholic, 100% Indonesian".
 Alexander Bekovich-Cherkassky – Russian officer of Circassian origin who led the first Russian military expedition into Central Asia.
 Alexander Kazembek – Russian Orientalist, historian and philologist of Azeri origin .
 Ali Sina – pseudonym of the founder of several anti-Islam and anti-Muslim websites.
 Aman Tuleyev – Russian governor of Kemerovo Oblast.

 Amir Sjarifuddin – Indonesian socialist leader who later became the second prime minister of Indonesia during its National Revolution.
 Aslan Abashidze – former leader of the Ajarian Autonomous Republic in western Georgia.
 Asmirandah – Indonesian actress of Dutch descent converted to Protestantism in December 2013. Zantman owes her conversion to an experience of having dreamed three times of Jesus Christ.
 Aurelius and Natalia – Christian martyrs who were put to death during the reign of Abd ar-Rahman II, Caliph of Córdoba for apostasy.
 Bahaa el-Din Ahmed Hussein el-Akkad – former Egyptian Muslim sheikh.
 Basuki Abdullah – Indonesian painter; converted to Roman Catholicism.
 Begum Samru – powerful lady of north India, ruling a large area from Sardhana, Uttar Pradesh.
 Bob Denard – French soldier and mercenary leader. Converted from Roman Catholicism to Judaism, then Islam and eventually back to Roman Catholicism.
 Broery – Indonesian singer (from Christianity to Islam back to Christianity).

 Brother Rachid – television presenter. He hosts a TV show called Daring Question which focuses on discussing and criticizing Islam.
 Carlos Menem – former President of Argentina. Raised a Muslim but converted to Roman Catholicism, the majority religion of Argentina, due to his political aspirations (before the 1994 reform, the Argentine Constitution established that the President of the Nation had to be a Roman Catholic).
 Casilda of Toledo – saint of the Roman Catholic Church.
 Chamillionaire – (born Hakeem Seriki) American rapper.
 Chulpan Khamatova – Russian actress.<ref>{{cite web|url=http://khamatova.ru/?i=240|title=Чулпан Хаматова - Потребность быть настоящей'|website=khamatova.ru}}</ref>
 Constantine the African – Baghdad-educated Muslim who died in 1087 as a Christian monk at Monte Cassino.
 The Clan Yusupov – noble family of Tatar descent down the Khans of the Nogai Horde, convert to Eastern Orthodox Christianity in the 17th century.
 Daniel Bambang Dwi Byantoro – leader (and Archimandrite) of the Indonesian Orthodox Church.
 Daveed Gartenstein-Ross – counter-terrorism expert and attorney (from Judaism to Islam to Christianity).Daveed Gartenstein-Ross  biography on his website.
 Descendants of Kuchum – former Muslim Genghisid family which converted to Russian Orthodox Christianity.
 Diana Nasution – Indonesian singer, converted to Protestantism after marriage.
 Djibril Cissé – footballer for club and country.Mondial : ces joueurs de foot ont la foi !, Benoît Fidelin, Pèlerin N° 6654, June 10, 2010 
 Don Juan of Persia – late-16th- and early-17th-century figure in Iran and Spain, converted from Shia Islam to Roman Catholicism.
 Donald Fareed – Iranian Christian tele-evangelist and minister.
 Eldridge Cleaver – Conversions/Associations to Nation of Islam then Evangelical Christianity then Mormonism.
 Emily Ruete – (born Sayyida Salme) Princess of Zanzibar and Oman.Emily Ruete, Ulrich Haarmann (Editor), E. Van Donzel (Editor), Leiden, Netherlands, (1992): An Arabian Princess Between Two Worlds: Memoirs, Letters Home, Sequels to the Memoirs, Syrian Customs and Usages. Presents the reader with a picture of life in Zanzibar between 1850–1865, and with an intelligent observer's reactions to life in Germany in the Bismarck period. Emily Ruete's writings describe her attempts to recover her Zanzibar inheritance and her homesickness. .
 Enrique de Malaca – Malay slave of Ferdinand Magellan, converted to Roman Catholicism after being purchased in 1511.
 Ergun Caner – Swedish-American academic, author, and Baptist minister.
 Estevanico – Berber originally from Morocco and one of the early explorers of the Southwestern United States.
 Fadhma Aït Mansour – mother of French writers Jean Amrouche and Taos Amrouche.
 Fathia Ghali – Egyptian princess and youngest daughter of Fuad I of Egypt and Nazli Sabri.
 Fathima Rifqa Bary – American teenager of Sri Lankan descent who drew international attention in 2009 when she ran away from home and claimed that her Muslim parents might kill her for having converted to Christianity.
 Fernão Lopes – Portuguese nobleman, soldier and the first known permanent inhabitant of the remote Island of Saint Helena in the South Atlantic Ocean.
 Francis Bok – Sudanese-American activist, convert to Islam from Christianity; but later returned to his Christian faith.
 St. George El Mozahem – Coptic saint
 George Weah – Liberian soccer player (from Christianity to Islam back to Christianity).
 Ghorban Tourani – former Iranian Sunni Muslim who became a Christian minister. Following multiple murder threats, he was abducted and murdered on November 22, 2005.
 Gulshan Esther – Pakistani convert from Islam to Christianity.
 Hakan Taştan and Turan Topal – two Turkish Christian converts who went on trial in 2006, on charges of "allegedly insulting 'Turkishness' and inciting religious hatred against Islam".
 Hamid Pourmand – former Iranian army colonel and lay leader of the Jama'at-e Rabbani, the Iranian branch of the Assemblies of God church in Iran.
 Hassan Dehqani-Tafti – Anglican Bishop of Iran from 1961 to 1990.
 Hazem Farraj – Palestinian American minister, writer, evangelist
 Hisn Jihan – Circassian wife of Bashir Shihab II. Muslim by birth, she was captured by Turkish slavers and converted to Maronite Catholicism after being released by Bashir and marrying him.
 House of Yusupov – former Muslim Genghisid family which converted to Russian Orthodox Christianity.
 Ibrahim Ben Ali – soldier, physician and one of the earliest American settlers of Turkish origin.
 Ibrahim Njoya – Bamum people religion; back and forth conversions from Islam to Christianity. Also created his own religion.
 Ibrahim Tunggul Wulung – Indonesian evangelist and missionary.
 Imad ud-din Lahiz – Prolific Islamic writer, preacher and Quranic translator.
 Jabalah ibn al-Aiham – last ruler of the Ghassanid state in Syria and Jordan in the seventh century AD. After the Islamic conquest of Levant he converted to Islam in AD 638. He reverted to Christianity later on and lived in Anatolia until he died in AD 645.
 Jacob Frank – 18th century Jewish religious leader who claimed to be the reincarnation of the self-proclaimed messiah Sabbatai Zevi, and also of King David. Frank publicly converted to Islam in 1757 and later to Christianity at Poland in 1759, but actually presented himself as the Messiah of a syncretic derivation of Shabbatai Zevi's Messianism now referred to as Frankism.
 James Scurry – British soldier and statesman.
 Jean-Bédel Bokassa – Central African Republic Emperor (from Roman Catholicism to Islam back to Roman Catholicism).
 Jessica Iskandar – Indonesian actress and model (from Christianity to Islam back to Christianity).
 Johannes Avetaranian – (born Muhammad Shukri Efendi), Christian missionary and Turkish descendant of Muhammad.
 Josef Mässrur – (born Ghäsim Khan) missionary to Chinese Turkestan with the Mission Union of Sweden.
 Josephine Bakhita – Roman Catholic saint from Darfur, Sudan.
 Julia Volkova – Russian singer and actress best known as a member of the Russian pop duo, t.A.T.u.
 Justinus Darmojuwono – first Indonesian cardinal of the Roman Catholic Church; served as Archbishop of Semarang from 1963 to 1981, and was elevated to the cardinalate in 1967; converted to Catholicism in 1932.
 Kabeer Gbaja-Biamila – American football player
 Kassian Cephas – Indonesian photographer.
Kiki Fatmala – Arab Indonesian actress.
 Kitty Kirkpatrick – daughter of James Achilles Kirkpatrick, British Resident in Hyderabad and Khair-un-Nissa, a Hyderabadi noblewoman.
 Kyai Sadrach – Indonesian missionary.
 Lakandula – Lakan of the pre-colonial Kingdom of Tondo
 Lina Joy – Javanese Malaysian former Muslim converted to Roman Catholicism. The desire to have her conversion recognized by law was the subject of a court case in Malaysia.
 Lukman Sardi – Indonesian actor converted to Christianity after marriage.
 Lyasan Utiasheva – Russian gymnast, convert to Eastern Orthodox Christianity.

 Magdi Allam – Italy's most famous Islamic affairs journalist.
 Majeed Rashid Mohammed – Kurdish Christian convert from Islam. He established a network with former Kurdish Muslims with about 2,000 members today.
 Malika Oufkir – author, activist and former prisoner of the Moroccan Royal Family.
Manohara Odelia Pinot – Indonesian model and actress. Former wife of Malaysian Kelantanese prince Tengku Muhammad Fakhry Petra.
 Maria Aurora von Spiegel – (born Fatima) was a Turkish mistress of Augustus II the Strong and the wife of a Polish noble.
 Maria Huberdina Hertogh – Dutch-Indonesian child kidnapped and forcibly converted to Islam during the World War II in 1943 by Malay Muslims but was eventually returned to her Catholic family in 1950.
 Maria Temryukovna – Circassian princess, and second wife to Ivan IV of Russia who was born in a Muslim upbringing, and baptised into the Russian Orthodox Church on August 21, 1561.
 Mario Joseph – former Indian Muslim preacher.
 Marina Nemat – Canadian author of Iranian descent and former political prisoner of the Iranian government. Born into a Christian family, she converted to Islam in order to avoid execution but later reverted to Christianity.
 Mark A. Gabriel – Egyptian writer
 Mark Huda Junayed Fino – Bangladeshi raised as a Muslim but converted to Protestantism in 2010.
 Mary Fillis
 Mathieu Kérékou – President of Benin (from Christianity to Islam back to Christianity).
 Matthew Ashimolowo – Nigerian-born British pastor and evangelist.
 Mehdi Dibaj – Iranian pastor and Christian activist.
 Mehmet Ali Ağca – Turkish ultra-nationalist assassin, who shot and wounded Pope John Paul II on May 13, 1981. In early 2009, Ağca renounced Islam in prison and announced his intention to convert to the Catholic faith upon release. 
 Michał Czajkowski – Polish-Cossack writer and political emigre who worked both for the resurrection of Poland and the reestablishment of a Cossack Ukraine.
 Mohammed Elewonibi – Nigerian-Canadian football player
 Mohammed Hegazy – first Egyptian Muslim convert to Christianity to seek official recognition of his conversion from the Egyptian Government.
 Momolu Dukuly – Liberian foreign minister.
 Mosab Hassan Yousef – son of Sheikh Hassan Yousef, a Hamas founder and one of its leader.
 Moussa Dadis Camara – ex-officer of the Guinean army.
 Muhsin Muhammad – football player for Carolina Panthers
 Nabeel Qureshi – former Ahmadi Muslim and now co-director of Acts 17 Apologetics Ministries. He has given lectures at universities and seminaries throughout North America.
 Nafa Urbach – Indonesian singer, actress and model.
 Nasir Siddiki – Canadian evangelist, author, and business consultant.
 Nazli Sabri – Queen consort of Egypt.
 Nonie Darwish – Egyptian-American writer and public speaker.
 Nur Luke – Uyghur Bible translator.
Olavo de Carvalho – Brazilian polemicist, philosopher, political pundit, astrologer and journalist.
Omar ibn Sa'id – Fula writer and a Muslim who was enslaved and transported to the United States in 1807.
 Parveen Babi – Indian actress, converted to Christianity during her later life, but buried according to Muslim rites.Snehal Fernandes. "She said we were her only family". Express India. Archived from the original on 2016-01-10. Retrieved 6 October 2012."Parveen Babi – Memories". Cineplot.com. 3 July 2011. Retrieved 6 October 2012."Babi will leaves relatives high and dry". The Times of India. 28 April 2005. Retrieved 6 October 2012.
 Patrick Sookhdeo – British Anglican canon
 Paul Mulla – Turkish Muslim and professor of Islamic Studies at the Pontifical Oriental Institute.
 Pinkan Mambo – (born Pinkan Ratnasari Mambo) Indonesian singer converted in 2010. Decision taken after admitting she studied various religions of the world and eventually dropped in awe of Jesus Christ.
 Qadry Ismail – former American football player.
 Qasim Khanate – some Muslim begs and Khans of the Qasim Khanate converted to Russian Orthodox Christianity.
 Raghib Ismail – former American football player.
 Rajah Humabon – first Filipino Sultan convert to Roman Catholicism in the name of Carlos.
 Rajah Matanda – sovereign of the Kingdom of Maynila
 Rashid Nurgaliyev – Russian politician and general convert to Russian Orthodoxy.

 Rianti Cartwright – Indonesian actress, model, presenter and VJ. Two weeks before departure to the United States to get married, Rianti left the Muslim faith to become a baptized Catholic with the name Sophia Rianti Rhiannon Cartwright.
 Rotimi Adebari – first Black mayor in Ireland.
 Roy Marten – (born Wicaksono Abdul Salam) Indonesian actor whose family was converted to Roman Catholicism during his childhood but who converted later to Indonesian Orthodoxy in 1997.Roy Marten, who said that he has been a follower of the Church for three years  diakses 3 February 2006
 Rudolf Carl von Slatin – Anglo-Austrian soldier and administrator in the Sudan.
 Ruffa Gutierrez – Filipina actress, model and former beauty queen (from Christianity to Islam back to Christianity)
 Sabatina James – Pakistani-Austrian former Muslim and now an Austrian Roman Catholic author.
 Saeed and Nagmeh Abedini
 Saint Alodia and Saint Nunilo – Christian martyrs and confessors who were put to death during the reign of Abd ar-Rahman II, Caliph of Córdoba for apostasy.
Sarah Balabagan – Filipina who was imprisoned in the United Arab Emirates from 1994 to 1996 for murder. She was initially sentenced to death, but was later returned to the Philippines. 
 Sayed Borhan khan – Khan of Qasim Khanate from 1627 to 1679.
 Saye Zerbo – President of the republic of Upper Volta (now Burkina Faso).
 Sheikh Deen Muhammad – (I.E. Sake Dean Mahomed) British Indian traveller, surgeon and entrepreneur who introduced shampooing and the Indian take-away curry house restaurant in Britain, and was the first Indian to have written a book in the English language.
 Shams Pahlavi – Iranian princess and the elder sister of Mohammad Reza Pahlavi, Shah of Iran.
Sharena Gunawan – Indonesian actress and model. Converted to Christianity after remarried with Indonesian actor Ryan Delon Situmeang.
 The Shihab family – prominent Lebanese noble family. The family originally belonged to Sunni Islam and converted to Maronite Catholicism at the end of the 18th century.
 The Sibirsky family – foremost of many Genghisid (Shaybanid) noble families formerly living in Russia.
 Sigi Wimala – Indonesian model and actress, converted to Catholicism after marriage.
 Simeon Bekbulatovich – Khan of Qasim Khanate.

 Skanderbeg – Albanian monarch and military leader. Skanderbeg converted to Islam from Christianity but reverted to Christianity later in life.
 Soraya Esfandiary-Bakhtiari – second wife and Queen Consort of Mohammad Reza Pahlavi, the late Shah of Iran who converted to Roman Catholicism.
 Ștefan Răzvan – Gypsy prince who ruled Moldavia for six months in 1595.
 Taysir Abu Saada – former member of the PLO and the founder of the christian ministry Hope For Ishmael after he converted to christianity. He was Yasir Arafat's personal driver.
 Thomas Yayi Boni – President of Benin
 Tunch Ilkin – (born Tunç Ali İlkin) Turkish American sports broadcaster and a former American football player
 Ubayd-Allah ibn Jahsh – brother of Zaynab bint Jahsh, the wife of Muhammad and one of the male Sahaba (companions of the Prophet).
 Udo Ulfkotte – German journalist who was born a Christian, became an atheist, then converted to Islam and finally converted back to Christianity.
 Umar ibn Hafsun – leader of anti-Ummayad dynasty forces in southern Iberia. Hafsun converted to Christianity with his sons and ruled over several mountain valleys for nearly forty years, having the castle Bobastro as his residence.
 Utameshgaray of Kazan – Khan of Kazan Khanate
 Walid Shoebat – American author and self-proclaimed former member of the PLO
 Wu'erkaixi – Uyghur dissident known for his leading role during the Tiananmen protests of 1989.
 Yadegar Moxammat of Kazan (Yadegar Mokhammad of Kazan) – last khan of Kazan Khanate
 Youcef Nadarkhani – Iranian Christian pastor who has been sentenced to death for apostasy.
 Zachariah Anani – former Sunni Muslim Lebanese militia fighter
 Zaida of Seville – refugee Andalusian Muslim princess who was a mistress and then perhaps queen of Alfonso VI of Castile

Converted to the Bábí and Baháʼí Faith

These were mostly people who were followers of the Bahá'u'lláh at the time he founded the Baháʼí Faith. They were formerly Muslims.
 'Abdu'l-Karim Amín Khawja – first native Algerian convert to the Baháʼí Faith.
 Hají Ákhúnd – eminent follower of Bahá'u'lláh. He was appointed a Hand of the Cause, and identified as one of the nineteen Apostles of Bahá'u'lláh.
 Ibn-i-Abhar – appointed a Hand of the Cause, and identified as one of the nineteen Apostles of Bahá'u'lláh.
 Mírzá Abu'l-Fadl – foremost Baháʼí scholar who helped spread the Baháʼí Faith in Egypt, Turkmenistan, and the United States. One of the few Apostles of Bahá'u'lláh who never actually met Bahá'u'lláh.
 Mírzá Mahmúd – eminent follower of Bahá'u'lláh, the founder of the Baháʼí Faith.
 Mishkín-Qalam – prominent Baháʼí and one of the nineteen Apostles of Bahá'u'lláh, as well as a famous calligrapher of 19th century Persia.
 Nabíl-i-A'zam – Baháʼí historian and one of the nineteen Apostles of Bahá'u'lláh
 Núrayn-i-Nayyirayn – two brothers who were beheaded in the city of Isfahan in 1879.
 Sami Doktoroğlu – early and important member of the Baháʼí Faith in Turkey.
 Somaya Ramadan – 2001 winner of the Naguib Mahfouz Medal for Literature.
 Táhirih – Persian poet and theologian of the Bábí faith in Iran.

Converted to an Indian religion

Converted to Hinduism

 Annapurna Devi (born Roshanara Khan) – surbahar (bass sitar) player and music teacher in the North Indian classical tradition. She converted to Hinduism upon marriage.
 Anwar Shaikh – British author
 Aashish Khan (born Ustad Aashish Khan Debsharma) – Indian musician
 Asha Gawli – (born Ayesha) wife of Arun Gawli, notorious gangster turned politician from Mumbai, India. She converted to Hinduism upon marriage.
 Bukka I – King of Vijayanagara empire who converted to Islam, then reverted to Hinduism. The early life of Bukka as well as his brother Hakka (also known as Harihara I) are relatively unknown and most accounts of their early life are based on theories.Chopra, P.N. T.K. Ravindran and N. Subrahmaniam.History of South India. S. Chand, 2003. .
 Chander Mohan – former Deputy Chief Minister of Haryana State in India. He was born Chandra Mohan he converted to Islam after marriage and again reverted to Hinduism after his divorce.Chand Mohammed converts back to Hinduism – July 28, 2009, The Times of India.
 Happy Salma – Indonesian actress, writer, model, became princess and member of the Lordship of Ubud after marriage.
 Haridas Thakura – prominent Vaishnavite saint, instrumental in the early appearance and spread of Hare Krishna movement.
 Harihara I – King of Vijayanagara Empire who converted to Islam, then reconverted.
 Harilal Mohandas Gandhi – son of Mahatma Gandhi. Upon converting to Islam he adopted the name Abdullah Gandhi, but later again reverted to Hinduism.
 Ifa Sudewi – Indonesian chief judge for the 2002 Bali bombing trials.Five bombers were prepared to die  The Australian, 25 May 2003.
 Khushboo Sundar – Tamil movie actress. She converted to Hinduism upon marriage.
Nargis – Bollywood film actress. Mother of Indian actor Sanjay Dutt.
 Netaji Palkar – Maratha noble and commander-in-chief of the army of Chhatrapati Shivaji, 19 June 1676.
 Sarmad – 17th-century mystical poet and sufi saint, arrived from Persia to India, beheaded for assumed heresy by the Mughal emperor, Aurungzebe. Sarmad renounced Judaism, briefly converting to Islam and then Hinduism. He later denounced all religions and rejected belief in god.Hazrat Sarmad Shaheed: The Naked Sufi Martyr 
Sukmawati Sukarnoputri – daughter of Indonesia's founding president Sukarno and his wife Fatmawati. Sister of former Indonesian president Megawati Sukarnoputri, Sukmawati converted to Hinduism during a Sudhi Wadani ceremony in October 2021.
Zubeida – Bollywood film actress, on whose life story the film Zubeidaa was based. She converted to Hinduism upon marriage.
 Pandit Mahendra Pal Arya (b.1957) – previously known as Mehboob Ali, a former imam in Uttar Pradesh, India, became an Arya Samaj preacher, Hindu apologist and leader of Arya Kendriya Sabha.
Mahmudul Hasan – Bangladeshi cricketer. Changed name to Niranjan Das.
Wasim Rizvi – Indian Shia and WAQF board chairman, converted to Hinduism.
Ali Akbar – Kerala film maker, reverted to Hinduism.

Converted to Buddhism

 Bunnag family – Thai family of Persian descent.
 Kenneth Hsien-yung Pai (b. 1937) – Chinese American writer of Hui descent.
 Napapa Tantrakul (b. 1986) – Thai actress
 Sri Sulalai (1770–1837) – princess of the royal family of the Sultanate of Singora. Rama II of Siam took her as a concubine.
 Suraj Randiv (b. 1985) – Sri Lankan cricketer
 Tillakaratne Dilshan (b. 1976) – Sri Lankan cricketer
 Tillakaratne Sampath (b. 1982) – Sri Lankan cricketer
 Wong Ah Kiu (1918–2006) – Malay woman born to a Muslim family but was raised as Buddhist; her conversion from Islam became a legal issue in Malaysia on her death

Converted to Sikhism
 Bhai Mardana
 Kuldip Manak – deceased Punjabi folk singer

Part of an unorganized religion or no religion

 Mansiya V.P.  a Bharatnatyam exponent from Kerala India. Non-conformist on religious front but believes in God.

Became atheists

 Abdullah al-Qasemi – Saudi Arabian 20th-century writer and intellectual. Former Salafist who became atheist and rejected organized religion.
 Afshin Ellian – Iranian-Dutch professor of law, philosopher, poetR.A.Berman, Freedom or Terror: Europe Faces Jihad (Stanford: Hoover Institution Press 2010.
 Ahmed Harqan – Egyptian human rights activist and outspoken atheist.
 Ahmed Sharif – Bangladeshi humanist book seller, human rights activist and secular humanist.
 Al-Ma'arri – blind Arab philosopher, poet and writer.
 Alexander Aan – Indonesian atheist and ex-Muslim of Minang descent, who was attacked by a mob and arrested in 2012 for posting "God does not exist" and other antireligious writings on Facebook, attracting international attention.
 Ali A. Rizvi – Pakistani-born Canadian physician, writer and ex-Muslim activist
 Ali Soilih – Comorian socialist revolutionary; president of the Comoros
 Ali Dashti – Iranian rationalist and member of Iranian Senate. 
 Aliaa Magda Elmahdy – Egyptian internet activist and women's rights advocate.
 Aliyah Saleem – British secular education campaigner, writer and market researcher, activist and co-founder of advocacy group Faith to Faithless.
 Anwar Shaikh – British author of Pakistani descent.
 Armin Navabi – Iranian-born atheist and secular activist, author, podcaster and vlogger, founder of Atheist Republic
 Aroj Ali Matubbar – self-taught Bangladeshi philosopher
 Arzu Toker – German-speaking writer, journalist, publicist, translator of Turkish descent, cofounder of the Central Council of Ex-Muslims in Germany.
 As'ad Abu Khalil – Lebanese professor of political science at California State University, Stanislaus. He describes himself as an "atheist secularist".Between disparate worlds: On California State University professor As'ad AbuKhalil  (1: "...who is also an atheist..." 2: "My Sunni family of my mother taught me how to pray").
 Asif Mohiuddin – Bangladeshi blogger and secularist
 Ayaan Hirsi Ali – Somali-born Dutch feminist, writer, and politician.
 Ayaz Nizami – Pakistani Muslim became atheist, Founder of realisticapproach.org. an Urdu website about atheism, and Vice President of Atheist & Agnostic Alliance Pakistan He is currently detained under the charges of blasphemy and could face the death penalty.
 Ayman Odeh – Israeli politician
 Aziz Nesin – popular Turkish humorist and author of more than 100 books.
 Barack Obama Sr. – Kenyan senior governmental economist, and the father of 44th U.S. President Barack Obama
 Bisi Alimi – Nigerian gay rights activist based in the United Kingdom
 Catherine Perez-Shakdam – French journalist, political analyst and commentator; formerly a convert to Islam, born to a Jewish family
 Bonya Ahmed – Bangladeshi-American author, humanist activist and blogger, wife of Avijit Roy; hacked to death after receiving threats related to his promotion of secular views.
 E. A. Jabbar – Indian ex-Muslim, orator, writer, retired school teacher of Kerala. Editor of Yukthiyugam Malayalam MagazineE. A. Jabbar Blogs
 Ebru Umar – Dutch columnist of Turkish descent, critic of Islam and of Turkish president Recep Tayyip Erdoğan.
 Enver Hoxha – Communist dictator who declared Albania the first atheist state, and who has been identified as an "arch-atheist."
 Fatima Sana Shaikh – Indian actress
 Faik Konitza – Albanian stylist, critic, publicist and political figure that had a tremendous impact on Albanian writing and on Albanian culture at the time.
 Faisal Saeed Al Mutar – Iraqi-born satirist, human rights activist, writer, founder of the Global Secular Humanist Movement (GSHM).
 Farhan Akhtar – Indian actor, singer, songwriter, playback singer, producer and television host.
 Fauzia Ilyas – founder of Atheist & Agnostic Alliance Pakistan
 Fazıl Say – Turkish pianist, sued for having expressed his atheism publicly.
 Gauhar Raza – Indian scientist, Urdu poet and filmmaker. 
 Hafid Bouazza – Moroccan-Dutch writer. Quote: (Translation) "Look, I'm an atheist. I do not believe that God exists, I do not believe there is an afterlife. How terrible it may be: Hitler isn't in hell getting pinched in his ass with a trident. I'm fine with the fact there are people who do believe that and get comfort from it, like my mother. I just hope the influence of religion on policy makers will diminish, because my freedom is precious to me." (Dutch) "Kijk, ik ben atheïst. Ik geloof niet dat God bestaat, ik geloof niet dat er een hiernamaals is. Hoe gruwelijk ook: Hitler wordt op dit moment niet in de hel met een drietand in zijn reet geprikt. Dat er mensen zijn die dat wél geloven en daar troost uit putten, mensen als mijn moeder: prima. Als de invloed van religies op beleidsmakers maar steeds kleiner wordt, want mijn vrijheid is me dierbaar."
 Hamed Abdel-Samad – German-Egyptian political scientist, historian and author.
 Hassan Bahara – Moroccan-Dutch writer.
 Humayun Azad – Bangladeshi author, poet and linguists.Bangladesh: Protecting the Human Rights of Thought, Conscience, and Religion: U.A.B. Razia Akter Banu Prepared Testimony  – ("Dr. Azad is a Muslim by birth and by name ... He is an atheist.")
 Inkulab – Tamil rationalist poet/writer and Marxist activist. Born as Sakul Hameed.Padma, V. (September 2000). "Re-presenting protest and resistance on stage: Avvai". Indian Journal of Gender Studies. 7 (2): 217–230. doi:10.1177/097152150000700205.
 Irfan Habib – Indian historian.
 Ismael Adham – Egyptian writer and philosopher.
 Ismail Kadare – world-renowned Albanian writer.
 Ismail Mohamed (activist) – Egyptian atheist human rights activist, host of The Black Ducks programme.
 Javed Akhtar – noted Indian writer and lyricist.
 Kacem El Ghazzali – Moroccan-Swiss writer and activist.
 Kanan Makiya – Iraqi-American academic and Islamic and Middle Eastern
 Kareem Amer – Egyptian blogger.Abdelkareem Nabil Soliman (Kareem Amer), Political prisoner  Submitted on Mon, 2007-01-29.
 Kumail Nanjiani – Pakistani American stand-up comic and actor.
 Lounès Matoub – Algerian Berber Kabyle singer.
 Maryam Namazie – Iranian communist, political activist and leader of the British apostate-organization Council of Ex-Muslims of Britain
 Massin Kevin Labidi – Dutch atheist activist of Tunisian descent, known for criticism of Islam.
 Mina Ahadi – Iranian-born pacifist, founder of the German apostate-organization "Zentralrat der Ex-Muslime"
 Mirza Fatali Akhundov – 19th century Azerbaijani playwright and philosopher.
 Muhammad Syed – Pakistani American speaker and political activist. Co-founder of Ex-Muslims of North America.
 Nahla Mahmoud – Sudanese-born British writer, secularist, environmentalist, and human rights activist, and spokesperson for the Council of Ex-Muslims of Britain.
 Parvin Darabi – Iranian born American activist, writer and woman's rights activist.
 Pelin Batu – Turkish actress and television personalityPelin Batu - "Bayrak taşır gibi din taşımıyorum, ateistim"  (in Turkish)
 Rahaf Mohammed – Saudi Arabian refugee in Canada whose January 2019 flight attracted international attention and involved diplomatic intervention.
 Ramiz Alia – Albanian communist leader and former president of Albania.
 Rana Ahmad – Saudi Arabian refugee in Germany, author, women's rights activist and founder of the Atheist Refugee Relief
 Razib Khan- Bangladeshi-American writer in population genetics and consumer genomics.
 Sagopa Kajmer – Turkish rap musician, songwriter, record producer and DJ
 Salman Rushdie – British-Indian novelist and essayist.
 Sam Touzani – Belgian actor, TV presenter, choreographer and comedian with Moroccan roots, critic of both the far-right and Islamism.
 Sarah Haider – American writer, speaker, political activist and co-founder of Ex-Muslims of North America.
 Sarmad Kashani – seventeenth-century mystical poet and sufi saint, arrived from Persia to India, beheaded for assumed heresy by the Mughal emperor, Aurungzebe. Sarmad renounced Judaism, briefly converting to Islam and then Hinduism. He later denounced all religions and rejected belief in gods.
 Sibel Kekilli – German actress of Turkish origin, known for her role as 'Shae' in Game of Thrones. Kekili was raised as a Muslim, but does not belong to any religion anymore, and although she stated she respects all religions, has criticised the physical mistreatment of women in Islam.
 Sherif Gaber – Egyptian political activist and blogger.
 Sofia Ashraf – Indian rapper and singer. 
 Taslima Nasrin – Bangladeshi author, feminist, human rights activist and secular humanist.
 Turan Dursun – Turkish author and muslim. He was once a Turkish mufti and later authored many books critical of Islam.
 Valon Behrami – Kosovo-born Swiss professional footballer who plays as a midfielder for English club Watford.
 Yasmine Mohammed – Canadian-born human rights activist, founder of Free Hearts, Free Minds and author of Unveiled: How Western Liberals Empower Radical Islam.
 Zackie Achmat – South African anti-HIV/AIDS activist; founder of the Treatment Action Campaign.
 Zara Kay – Tanzanian-Australian activist, founder of Faithless Hijabi.
 Zineb El Rhazoui – Moroccan-born French journalist and former columnist for Paris-based satirical magazine Charlie Hebdo.
 Zoya Akhtar – Indian director and screenwriter.

Became agnostics
 Abdullah al-Qasemi – one of the most controversial intellectuals in the Arab world because of his radical change from defending Salafism to defending atheism and rejecting organized religion.
 Alyque Padamsee – Indian theatre personality and ad filmmaker. He was the father of Indian Advertizing. He was an agnostic.
 Cenk Uygur – Main host of the liberal talk radio show The Young Turks. He is an agnostic.
 Fareed Zakaria – Indian-American CNN host. He is a self described secular and non practicing Muslim. He added: "My views on faith are complicated—somewhere between deism and agnosticism. I am completely secular in my outlook."
 Ibn al-Rawandi – early skeptic of Islam.
 Ibn Warraq – British Pakistani secularist author and founder of the Institute for the Secularisation of Islamic Society
 Seema Mustafa – Indian journalist, Political Editor and Delhi Bureau Chief of The Asian Age newspaper.
 Wafa Sultan – Syrian-born American psychiatrist and controversial critic of Islam. She describes herself as a "Secular Humanist"There is No Clash of Civilizations but a Clash between the Mentality of the Middle Ages and That of the 21st century Feb. 2006.
 Dr. Younus Shaikh – Pakistani medical doctor, human rights activist, rationalist and free-thinker.
 Zohra Sehgal – Indian actress who has appeared in several Hindi and English language films.

Became deists
 Ahmad Kasravi – notable Iranian linguist, historian, and reformer.
 Ehsan Jami – former politician and founder of Central Committee for Ex-Muslims.

Became non-religious

 Mustafa Kemal Atatürk – Turkish field marshal, statesman, secularist reformer, and author. Sources point out that Atatürk was a religious skeptic and a freethinker. According to Atatürk, the Turkish people do not know what Islam really is and do not read the Quran. People are influenced by Arabic sentences that they do not understand, and because of their customs they go to mosques. When the Turks read the Quran and think about it, they will leave Islam. Atatürk described Islam as the religion of the Arabs in his own work titled Vatandaş için Medeni Bilgiler by his own critical and nationalist views.
 Nyamko Sabuni – politician in Sweden
 Safdar Hashmi – Indian Communist playwright and founding member of Jana Natya Manch.
 Sajid Javid – British politician
 Zayn Malik – English singer of Pakistani and English-Irish descent.
 Shayan Ali - Founder of Young Apostates, Pakistani born Ex-Muslim, free speech activist and fashion model based in United States. 
 Tarek Fatah – Canadian activist born in Pakistan, identifies as Indian.

Other
Religious founders

 Akbar the Great – Mughal emperor and founder of Dīn-i Ilāhī, a religious movement whose followers never numbered more than 19 adherents, although Akbar never renounced Islam publicly or privately, and modern scholars have argued that it was a spiritual discipleship program rather than a new religion.
 Ariffin Mohammed – founder of the Sky Kingdom who claimed a unique connection to God. In spite of renouncing Islam in 2001, he stated that there was no restriction on practising your own faith and at the same time belonging to the Sky Kingdom.
 Báb – founder of Bábism. Most of his followers later accepted Bahá'u'lláh and thus joined the Baháʼí Faith.
 Bahá'u'lláh – after the Bab's death, claimed to be the prophet the Báb spoke of, thereby founding the Baháʼí Faith.
 David Myatt – founded the Numinous Way
 Dwight York – African American author, black supremacist leader, musician, convicted child molester and founder of the religious doctrine called Nuwaubianism.
 Kabir – 15th-century mystical poet and founder of the Kabirpanthi. Born to a Hindu Brahmin widow but adopted and raised as Muslim by a childless Muslim couple, later denouncing both Hinduism and Islam.
 Musaylimah – self proclaimed prophet of the Banu Hanifa tribe who lived during and after the lifetime of Muhammad.
 Riaz Ahmed Gohar Shahi – founder of the spiritual movements Messiah Foundation International and Anjuman Serfaroshan-e-Islam.
 Ṣāliḥ ibn Tarīf – second king of the Berghouata. He proclaimed himself a Prophet/Mahdi and came out with his own Qur'an.
Sheikh Adi ibn Musafir – founder of Yazidism
 Sultan Sahak – founded Ahl-e Haqq
 Mirza Ghulam Ahmad – founded Ahmadiyya

Undetermined current belief system

 Charles Bronson – British criminal and self-styled "most violent prisoner in Britain"''.
 David Hicks – Australian-born Guantanamo Bay detainee who converted to Islam and was notorious in his homeland for his once support of radical Islam and for the circumstances surrounding his incarceration, is believed to have renounced Islam whilst incarcerated at Guantanamo Bay.
 Khalid Duran – specialist in the history, sociology and politics of the Islamic world.
 Lex Hixon – not raised religious; Conversions to Hinduism, Sufism. Eastern Orthodox Christianity, and possibly Zen.
 Linda Thompson – British folk singer who, along with her husband Richard, converted to Sufism in the 1970s. The couple have since divorced and she has left the religion.
 Trie Utami – Indonesian singer who after a stormy divorce is known to have left Islam after 2005, but she refuses to declare to what religion she converted.
 Wesley Snipes – American actor, film producer, and martial artist.
 Zayn Malik – English singer and songwriter.
 Tarek Fatah – Canadian activist born in Pakistan, who call himself an Indian.

See also
 Apostasy
 Apostasy in Islam
 Apostasy in Islam by country
 Criticism of Islam
Former Muslim
 List of converts to Islam
 Religious conversion

Other apostasy-related lists
List of ex-Muslim organisations
List of former Jews
List of former atheists and agnostics
List of former Protestants
List of former Roman Catholics
List of former Latter Day Saints
List of former Christians

References

External links

Former Muslims
 
Muslim, from